Tabu Abdallah Manirakiza commonly known as  Tabu Abdallah is a Burundian CNDD-FDD politician and former Finance minister. He held that position from 2012 to 2016 when he was replaced by Domitien Ndihokubwayo.

References 

Living people
Year of birth missing (living people)
National Council for the Defense of Democracy – Forces for the Defense of Democracy politicians
Government ministers of Burundi
Finance ministers